Astathes levis is a species of beetle in the family Cerambycidae. It was described by Newman in 1842. It is known from the Philippines.

Varietas
 Astathes levis var. basalis Thomson, 1865
 Astathes levis var. gallerucoides Thomson, 1865
 Astathes levis var. plagiata Gahan, 1901

References

L
Beetles described in 1842